Raffaele Calzini (29 December 1885 – 2 September 1953) was an Italian art critic and writer. His novel Segantini, romanzo della montagna, about the short-lived Alpine painter Giovanni Segantini, won the Premio Letterario Viareggio Rèpaci in 1934.

Publications 

Among Calzini's many works are:

 L'amore escluso. Milano: Sonzogno, [1920]
 Uberto dell'Orto, pittore. Roma: Alfieri et Lacroix, 1921
 La tela di Penelope. Roma: A. Mondadori, 1922
 Giorgio Lukomski. Milano : Bottega di poesia, 1923
 La collana d'ambra. Milano: Fratelli Treves, 1928
 Giuseppe Amisani. Milano : Edizioni del Poligono, 1931
 Paolo Vietti Violi. Genève : Les archives internationales, 1932
 Un cuore e due spade. Milano: Treves, 1932
 Segantini, romanzo della montagna. Milano: A. Mondadori, 1934
 La bella italiana da Botticelli al Tiepolo. Milano: Domus, 1935
 La commediante veneziana. Milano: Mondadori, 1935 
 Agonia della Cina. Milano: A. Mondadori, 1937
 Trionfi e disfatte di Nuova York. Milano: Ceschina, 1937
 Il taciturno. Milano: A. Mondadori, 1939
 Lampeggia al nord di Sant'Elena. Milano: A. Garzanti, 1941
 Amanti. Milano: A. Mondadori, 1941
 Gloria. Milano: Garzanti, 1945
 La bella italiana da Botticelli a Spadini. Milano: Editoriale Domus, 1945
 Edmea. Milano: A. Mondadori, 1945
 Milano fin de siècle: 1890-1900. Milano: U. Hoepli, 1946

References 

Italian art critics
Writers from Milan
Italian male journalists
1885 births
1953 deaths
20th-century Italian journalists
20th-century Italian male writers